St Aidan's Church, Caythorpe is a Chapel of Ease in the Church of England in Caythorpe, Nottinghamshire. It is notable as being one of very few surviving 'tin tabernacles', still in use a parish churches.  It was granted Grade II listed status by Historic England in July 2022.

History

The church was built in 1900 as a Chapel of Ease in the parish of Lowdham, and it remains in a joint parish with: 
St Mary's Church, Lowdham
St John the Baptist's Church, Gunthorpe

Organ
There is a pipe organ and a Canadian reed organ.

References

Church of England church buildings in Nottinghamshire
Grade II listed churches in Nottinghamshire